Hayrettinköy can refer to:

 Hayrettinköy, Bozkurt
 Hayrettinköy, Merzifon